Michael Chabala may refer to:

 Mike Chabala (born 1984), American soccer player
 Michael Chabala (Zambian footballer) (died 1995), Zambian footballer and coach